The 2020 Kimanis by-election is a by-election held on 18 January 2020 for the Dewan Rakyat seat of Kimanis. The seat was declared vacant after the Federal Court on 2 December 2019 upheld the Election Court's ruling earlier on 16 August, nullifying the sitting Member of Parliament (MP), Anifah Aman's victory in the 2018 general election (GE14). Anifah was the former Minister of Foreign Affairs from 2009 to 2018 and formerly a member of United Malays National Organisation (UMNO) part of the Barisan Nasional (BN) coalition until he left to become  independent, despite the fact that he had been a 4-term MP for Kimanis since 2004 and had just retained the seat under BN in the 2018 election a few months prior.

The Election Commission (EC) had set the nomination day on 4 January, early voting on 14 January and polling day for 18 January 2020 with a 14-day campaign period. The electoral roll in the parliamentary constituency to be used would be the one up to the third quarter of 2019 which was last updated on 9 December 2019 with a total of 29,664 voters made up of 52,698 ordinary voters, 9 early voters while 1 absentee voters (who are abroad). Kimanis which consists of the Bongawan and Membakut state seats, has about 68% Muslim-bumiputras voters of mainly Bruneian Malay, Bisaya and Bajau communities, some 25% non-Muslim bumiputras voters of mainly ethnic Kadazan-Dusun and Murut, while the remaining 7% were Chinese and others.

Nomination
On 11 December 2019, Sabah Pakatan Harapan (PH) Chairman and Deputy Chief Minister Christina Liew said that PH will pave way and support ally, Sabah Heritage Party (WARISAN) to field its candidate. Previously, the Malaysian United Indigenous Party (BERSATU) had offered to contest the by-election but decided to support the WARISAN candidate instead. Karim Bujang, the WARISAN candidate for Kimanis in GE14 who had lost and filed the election petition, was once again nominated as WARISAN's candidate for the by-election.

Sabah UMNO chief, Bung Mokhtar Radin confirmed that BN will contest the by-election by fielding a candidate from UMNO. BN decided to field UMNO Kimanis division chief and former Bongawan assemblyman, Mohamad Alamin as their candidate for the by-election.

The Pan-Malaysian Islamic Party (PAS) has announced its support for the BN candidate in the by-election. PAS secretary-general, Takiyuddin Hassan, said that the party will mobilise its election campaign machinery to support the BN candidate.

Anifah Aman, the incumbent prior to the disqualification, denied that he will contest the seat again. Anifah also said that he will return in the coming 15th General Election instead. Anifah has since declared his support for the BN candidate in the by-election.

The Liberal Democratic Party (LDP), Homeland Solidarity Party (STAR), United Sabah National Organisation (USNO Baru), Sabah Progressive Party (SAPP) and the Sabah United Party (PBS) have declined to contest the by-election,  paving the way for a possible straight fight between BN and Warisan.

On Nomination Day, BN's Mohamad Alamin and WARISAN's Karim Bujang filed their nomination papers, setting the stage for a two-cornered fight for the parliamentary seat.

Controversies and issues
The main issues in the by-election are not national matters but local issues such as the Sabah Temporary Pass or Pas Sementara Sabah (PSS) for Filipino refugees immigrants, bread-and-butter and job opportunities issues.

Election results

Results according to polling districts

Previous result

References

2020 elections in Malaysia
By-elections in Malaysia
Elections in Sabah
January 2020 events in Malaysia